Baila Comigo is a Brazilian telenovela produced and broadcast by Rede Globo. It premiered on 16 March 1981 and ended on 25 September 1981, with a total of 167 episodes. It's the twenty sixth "novela das oito" to be aired on the timeslot. It is created and written by Manoel Carlos and directed by Roberto Talma.

Cast

References

External links 
 

Television shows set in Rio de Janeiro (city)
TV Globo telenovelas
1981 telenovelas
Brazilian telenovelas
1981 Brazilian television series debuts
1981 Brazilian television series endings
Portuguese-language telenovelas
Television series about twins